The N3 class was a dreadnought battleship class designed for the Royal Navy after World War I, incorporating lessons learned from that conflict.

Background
In 1916 the US had declared its intention to create a Navy "second to none"; Congress had authorized the building of a large number of battleships and battlecruisers. In response, the Japanese government also began a large programme of warship building (the 8-8 fleet). Two improved  hulls were rebuilt into the two s by the Royal Navy during the war. The only new capital ships laid down during the war were the s. Their design had been called into question after the Battle of Jutland in 1916 and three ships of this class were cancelled, leaving only  to be completed to a modified design.

The US plan had been delayed by the wartime need to build smaller vessels. Nevertheless, estimates by the Admiralty were that by the early 1920s the Royal Navy would be behind in ships. By the beginning of 1920, the Americans had completed one battleship since the end of World War I and had five more building. Seven more were intended to be laid down in 1920–21, six of these were the very large and powerful , armed with twelve 16-inch guns. The Japanese had finished one battleship since the end of the war and had three more under construction. To correct this state of affairs, the Admiralty initially planned to build three battleships and one battlecruiser in Fiscal Year (FY) 1921–22 and again in FY 1922–23, but this was changed to four s to be built first, presumably to be followed by the same number of battleships the following year.

The only limitation of the design was the inability to use British dockyards and pass through the Suez Canal. The most unusual feature of these designs was that none of the turrets were superfiring, presumably to keep the centre of gravity as low as possible and avoid the extra weight required for tall, superfiring barbettes.

The designs were revised in October and split into separate battleship and battlecruiser designs. The battleship designs were given letters of the alphabet from L through N, with the use of triple or double gun turrets shown by 3 or 2 respectively. 'L2' displaced , but 'L3' was a thousand tons lighter. 'M2' and 'M3' followed in November and December and were very different from the earlier designs.

'M2' and 'M3' sacrificed fire directly astern by moving the rear turret(s) amidships in order to save weight by shortening the length of the armoured citadel. Compared to the earlier, more conventional, designs, 'M2' saved  and 'M3' . A lengthened version of 'M3' was chosen for further development as N3 and approved in November 1921.

Description

Most noticeable of the N3 design was the concentration of the main battery forward of the bridge and machinery spaces. A related feature of the design was the tower bridge structure behind the first two gun turrets. This provided a better and more stable foundation for fire-control equipment, greatly improved accommodation and protection from the weather.

The ships would have had two geared steam turbine sets, each of which drove one propeller shaft, in two engine rooms forward of the boiler rooms. This allowed the funnel to be placed further aft and increased the ability of the rear turret to fire to the rear. The ships' maximum speed would have been about 23 knots.

Housing the main armament in triple turrets was new to the Royal Navy though British companies had been involved in the production of triple-gun turret designs for other navies. The choice of a high muzzle velocity with a relatively lighter shell was taken from the German practice; it ran counter to previous British guns such as the BL 15-inch Mark I gun of 42-calibre length which were lower-muzzle-velocity weapons firing heavy shells.

Armament
The N3 design mounted nine 45-calibre BL 18-inch guns in three triple-gun turrets, designated 'A', 'B', and 'X' from front to rear. The guns had a maximum elevation of 40°. As none of these guns were ever completed and test-fired, sources differ on their exact specifications. The maximum penetration of those guns at zero obliquity would have been 36.82 inches (935.3 mm) of armor for a muzzle velocity of 2,700 fps, that is based upon the USN Empirical Formula for Armor Penetration, in theory that would have made those guns the most powerful naval weapons in the world, surpassing the penetration power of the 460 mm guns found on the Yamato. The N3s carried a secondary armament of sixteen BL 6-inch Mk XXII guns in superfiring twin turrets. Four turrets were sited around the forward superstructure and four at the stern. The guns could elevate between –5° and +60°. Their rate of fire was five rounds per minute.

An anti-aircraft battery of six QF 4.7-inch Mk VIII guns was included. They had a maximum depression of -5° and a maximum elevation of 90°. The ships were intended to carry four 10-barreled mountings for the  QF 2-pounder gun (commonly known as a pom-pom), two abaft the funnels and two at the stern. Each barrel was provided with 1300 rounds of ammunition. The gun's rate of fire was approximately 96–98 rounds per minute.

Like previous classes of British battleships, a pair of submerged, broadside-firing torpedo tubes were planned for these ships. Their compartment was located just forward of the 'A' shell room on the platform deck. Six  torpedoes per tube were to be carried in peace-time, but this would increase to eight in wartime.

Fire-control
The main guns of the battleships could be controlled from either of the two director-control towers (DCT). The primary DCT was mounted at the top of the forward superstructure. Another was mounted on the roof of the conning tower in an armoured hood. Each main gun turret was provided with a  coincidence rangefinder in an armoured housing on the turret roof. The secondary armament was primarily controlled by two DCTs mounted on each side of the bridge. The anti-aircraft guns were controlled by a high-angle control system mounted on the mizzenmast. Each pom-pom mount had its own director and there was also a height-finder aft. Two  torpedo rangefinders were located on the sides of the funnels.

Armour
A first for any British dreadnought was the use of the all or nothing protection scheme in the N3s and G3s. Medium-thickness armour had proven to be useless in stopping heavy-calibre shells during World War I so the vital areas of the ship were protected by the thickest possible armour and the rest of the ship was left unarmoured. This system of protection required that the armoured citadel have enough reserve buoyancy to keep the ship stable even if the rest of the hull was riddled by gunfire.

This angle increased the armor's relative thickness to horizontal, close-range fire, albeit at the cost of reducing its relative height which increased the chance of plunging shellfire going over or under it. The lower edge of the belt abreast the magazines was continued down another  by a  thickness of high-tensile steel inclined at 36° to prevent a shell from reaching the magazines via a wave trough at high speed. The ends of the belt terminated in  transverse bulkheads. The  armoured deck matched the length of the waterline belt and sloped down to meet the upper edge of the belt.

The armour of the barbettes and the conning tower was 15 inches thick and the conning tower's communications tube to the upper deck was 8 inches thick. The fire-control director atop the conning tower was protected by an armoured hood 4 to 6 inches thick.

The anti-torpedo bulges of the N3 were internal to the hull and were intended to withstand the explosion of a  torpedo warhead. The bulkhead was situated about  inboard from the side of the ship.

Cancellation
The four N3 battleships were never ordered because the Washington Naval Treaty, an arms limitation treaty under negotiation at the time, forbade construction of any ship larger than 35,000 tons. Many of the aspects of their design ultimately were incorporated into the two s, and they are often described as being a cut-down N3. Indeed, the Nelsons received the design designation 'O3', marking them as next in the design sequence, although they used the guns intended for the G3 battlecruisers for cost reasons and to comply with the Treaty's 16-inch limitation on main armament. Though far from receiving names, the four vessels of the N3 design have since been associated, albeit speculatively, with the names of the four patron saints of Scotland, England, Ireland and Wales, those being HMS St. Andrew, HMS St. George, HMS St. Patrick and HMS St. David respectively.

Notes

Citations

References

 
 
 
 
 

Abandoned military projects of the United Kingdom
Battleship classes
Cancelled ships
N3-class battleships
Proposed ships of the Royal Navy
Ship classes of the Royal Navy